American Pickers (or also known as The Pickers for international) is an American reality television series that premiered on January 18, 2010 on History, produced by A&E Television Networks in collaboration with Cineflix Media. In the series, the hosts travel across America in search of rare Americana artifacts and national treasures that they can buy from the collectors to add to their personal collections or sell in their antique shops.

Overview 

The show follows antique and collectible pickers Mike Wolfe and Frank Fritz, who travel around the United States to buy (or "pick") various items for resale, for clients, or for their personal collections.  Danielle Colby runs the office of Wolfe's business, Antique Archaeology, from their home base in LeClaire, Iowa, and more recently at a second location in Nashville, Tennessee. They originally traveled in a Mercedes-Benz Sprinter van and now in a Ford Transit.  Fritz sells his acquisitions at his own shop, and on his website, Frank Fritz Finds, upriver in Savanna, Illinois. The men go on the road, not only following up leads that Colby has generated but also "freestyling" – stopping at places that look like they might hold items worth buying. They also pick some places more than once.

The series introduction is narrated by Wolfe and Fritz. The first three seasons used a lengthy introduction, but beginning with Season 4, a shortened version began to be used:

Mike and Frank explore people's homes, barns, sheds, outbuildings, and other places where they have stored antiques and collectibles. They call upon amateur and serious collectors, hoarders, and also people who have inherited overwhelming collections of items that they don't know what to do with. Wolfe, who has been picking since age four, has a particular interest in antique motorcycles, air-cooled Volkswagens, old bicycles and penny-farthings, while Fritz has a fondness for antique toys, oil cans, and old Hondas, with a special love for peanut-related items. They have purchased old advertisements and commercial signage, film posters, a rare 15-gallon visible gasoline pump, and a Piaggio Ape (pronounced "ah-pay") that one of their friends told them is probably the only one of its kind in North America.

In December 2011, American Pickers revealed that Antique Archaeology had leased part of a former 1914 car factory in Nashville, Tennessee, which originally made the Marathon automobile, for a second business location to decrease the distance required to haul their finds from the southern states.

On March 13, 2018, Mike Wolfe made a cameo as himself on a season 15 episode of NCIS titled "One Man's Trash".

On July 21, 2021, The History Channel announced that Frank Fritz would be departing from the cast of American Pickers. On July 21, 2022, various news outlets reported that Fritz was hospitalized with a stroke after Wolfe posted about it on social media. Since then, Danielle Colby, Mike Wolfe's younger brother Robbie, and friend and antiques expert "Jersey Jon" Szalay have taken turns accompanying Mike on his road trips. At times, they also strike out on their own at the same time that Mike Wolfe is on the road.

Reception
The series debuted on January 18, 2010. The premiere episode of American Pickers had 3.1 million viewers, making it the highest rated History channel debut since Ice Road Truckers in 2007. The September 8, 2010, episode "Laurel & Hardy" garnered Nielsen ratings as high as 5.3 million viewers in the 25–54 age group. As of that episode, the show retained the title of #1 new non-fiction series of 2010 among all viewers and adults 25–54.

Australia

American Pickers was also shown in Australia, on 7mate. In 2013 an Australian version of the show, called Aussie Pickers, premiered on 7mate. The series ran until 2014, lasting two seasons. In 2019, Road to Riches was launched on A&E Australia.

Episodes

Home media

In other media

In the NCIS episode, "One Man's Trash", Gibbs and Ducky watch American Pickers and see an antique war stick from a 16-year-old cold case. Mike Wolfe guest stars as himself in the episode.

See also
Canadian Pickers / Cash Cowboys (2011–13), a similar TV series featuring two pickers in Canada; produced by Cineflix Media for the History channel in Canada.
Picker Sisters, a 2011 TV series about two female pickers/designers.
Picked Off, History's 2012 reality competition series, also produced by Cineflix Media.

References

External links
 
 History's "Meet the Pickers" cast bios
 Official Antique Archaeology website
 Official Frank Fritz Finds website
 
 "American Pickers": The Inside Story of the History Channel’s Surprise Hit, Jeff Ignatius, River Cities' Reader, 17 March 2010

2010 American television series debuts
2010s American reality television series
2020s American reality television series
Antiques television series
English-language television shows
History (American TV channel) original programming
Television shows set in Iowa
Television series by Cineflix